Jim Pomeroy (November 16, 1952 – August 6, 2006) was an American professional motocross racer. He competed in the AMA Motocross Championships from 1972 to 1973 and in the Motocross World Championships from 1973 to 1976, before returning to compete in the AMA Motocross Championships from 1977 to 1978. Pomeroy is notable for being the first American competitor to win an overall victory in an FIM Motocross World Championship Grand Prix race.

Professional racing career

Born in Sunnyside, Washington, Pomeroy's family relocated to Yakima, Washington shortly after he was born. His father owned a motorcycle shop that had employed Evel Knievel before he became a famous daredevil stunt rider. Pomeroy began to race professionally in Canada to circumvent the American Motorcyclist Association's 18-year-old age restriction and ended up winning the Western Canadian Championship. He made his AMA debut in 1970 and posted a sixth-place finish in the support race of the 1970 Trans-AMA motocross series round in Washington. 

In 1972 he competed in the inaugural AMA Motocross National Championship. He won the season opening 250cc race at Saddleback Park in California before, switching to the 500cc class where he finished the 1972 season in fifth place overall. His performance earned him Bultaco factory support through a local Bultaco concession. He was offered the opportunity to compete in a few select world championship Grand Prix events in Europe and he readily accepted. At the end of the 1972 season, Pomeroy along with Brad Lackey, Jimmy Weinert and Gary Jones were selected by the AMA to be the first-ever team to represent the United States at the Motocross des Nations where the team posted a seventh place result.

At the time in the early 1970s, European riders still dominated the sport of motocross and Americans weren't considered as talented due to their relative lack of experience in the nascent motorsport. Pomeroy arrived in Europe as an unknown and then proceeded to shock the motorcycle world by riding his privateer Bultaco to an upset victory in the 1973 250cc Spanish motocross Grand Prix. The news of his unexpected victory created a huge wave of excitement in the American motorcycle community where motocross was undergoing an explosive growth in popularity. His victory signaled that American motocross riders were ready to compete with the best in the world. The Bultaco factory quickly hired him to remain in Europe to compete in the 250cc motocross world championship. Pomeroy was once again named to the American team for the 1973 Motocross des Nations event where he helped the team improve to a fourth place result.

In the 1974 season, Pomeroy placed 14th overall in the 250cc motocross world championship. Pomeroy along with Brad Lackey, Jimmy Weinert and Tony DiStefano represented the United States at the 1974 Motocross des Nations event where they finished in an impressive second-place, marking the best-ever result at the time for an American team at the event. Pomeroy continued to race for Bultaco in the world championships until 1976 when he posted a career-high finish of fourth place against the best riders in the world. He also posted another impressive result at the 1975 Trophée des Nations where he won a race during which he defeated the reigning 500cc world champion, Roger De Coster.

Despite his success in the world championships, Pomeroy accepted a contract offer to race for Honda in the AMA national championships in 1977. He began the season by finishing second to Bob Hannah in the 1977 Supercross championship and, followed that with a third-place finish in the 250cc national championship final standings behind Tony DiStefano and Marty Smith. Also in 1977, Pomeroy became the first American competitor to win a moto at the 500cc United States Motocross Grand Prix. Following an injury plagued season in 1978, Pomeroy returned to Europe in 1979 to compete for Bultaco in the world championships. Unfortunately, the Bultaco factory was experiencing financial difficulties and closed a few months later. He then switched to compete for the Beta factory team however, their motorcycle proved to be too fragile and unreliable for the rigors of world championship motocross.

Post-racing career
By 1980, injuries had begun to take a physical toll on his body and Pomeroy made the decision to retire from competition. He continued his involvement in the sport of motocross by conducting motocross schools and by participating in American Historic Racing Motorcycle Association events involving vintage motorcycles. Pomeroy was inducted into the AMA Motorcycle Hall of Fame in 1999.

On August 6, 2006, Pomeroy was killed when his Jeep rolled in a single-vehicle accident near Yakima, Washington.

Career Highlights
 The first American to win an FIM Motocross World Championship Event (Spain 1973)
 The first rider to win his debut World Championship Motocross Grand Prix race (Spain 1973)
 The first American to lead the Motocross World Championship (Spain 1973)
 The first rider to win a World Championship Motocross Grand Prix on a Spanish motorcycle (Bultaco)
 The first winner of an indoor Supercross race (Houston, 1974)
 The first American to lead the Trans-AMA Championship (1975)
 The first American to win a moto at the 500cc United States Motocross Grand Prix (Carlsbad 1977)
 The first non-world champion to win the Trophée des Nations event (1975)

Motocross Grand Prix Results
1973 250cc Motocross World Championship - 7th (Bultaco)
1974 250cc Motocross World Championship - 14th (Bultaco)
1975 250cc Motocross World Championship - 7th (Bultaco)
1976 250cc Motocross World Championship - 4th (Bultaco)
1977 250cc AMA Motocross National Championship - 3rd (Honda)
1978 250cc AMA Motocross National Championship - 5th (Honda)

References

External links
Motorcycle Hall of Fame biography

1952 births
2006 deaths
Sportspeople from Yakima, Washington
American motocross riders
Road incident deaths in Washington (state)